Caucasus Viceroyalty may refer to:
 Caucasus Viceroyalty (1785–1796)
 Caucasus Viceroyalty (1801–1917)